The Greek tradition at Carnegie Mellon University began  years ago with the founding of the first fraternity on campus, Theta Xi, in 1912. As of the fall semester of 2016, the Greek community consists of 25 active fraternities and sororities: 6 Panhellenic sororities; 11 Interfraternity Council fraternities; 2 Asian American groups "(1 fraternity and 1 sorority)"; 4 National Pan-Hellenic (historically African American) chapters represented on campus (2 fraternities and 2 sororities); 1 Music Fraternity for Women, and 1 Professional Business fraternity.

Current Interfraternity Council fraternities:
Alpha Epsilon Pi
Alpha Sigma Phi
Alpha Tau Omega
Delta Tau Delta
Kappa Sigma
Pi Kappa Alpha
Phi Delta Theta 
Sigma Alpha Epsilon
Sigma Nu
Sigma Phi Epsilon
Sigma Chi

Current Professional fraternities:
Alpha Kappa Psi
Sigma Alpha Iota

Current Panhellenic sororities:
Alpha Chi Omega
Alpha Phi
Delta Delta Delta
Delta Gamma
Kappa Alpha Theta
Kappa Kappa Gamma

Current Pan-Hellenic Chapters (Historically African-American):
Alpha Kappa Alpha
Alpha Phi Alpha
Delta Sigma Theta
Kappa Alpha Psi

Current Multicultural Greek Council fraternities and sororities:
alpha Kappa Delta Phi
Lambda Phi Epsilon

Current Service fraternities:
Alpha Phi Omega

Carnegie Mellon University
Carnegie Mellon University